Arnold Kimber (born 24 March 1947 in Tartu) is an Estonian politician. He was a member of the X Riigikogu.

He is a member of Estonian Centre Party.

References

1947 births
Living people
Estonian Centre Party politicians
Members of the Riigikogu, 2003–2007
Tallinn University of Technology alumni
Politicians from Tartu